Lijordet is a station on the Røa Line of the Oslo Metro. It is located between Østerås and Eiksmarka, 9.6 km from Stortinget. It is the second of three stations on the Røa Line within Bærum municipality.

The station was opened in 1951 when Røabanen was expanded from Grini to Lijordet.

References

External links

Oslo Metro stations in Bærum
Railway stations opened in 1951
1951 establishments in Norway